Jean Dax (born Gontran-Théodore-Louis-Henri Willar; 17 September 1879 – 6 June 1962) was a French actor who appeared in more than seventy films during his career. He appeared in Maurice Tourneur's 1928 film The Crew

Selected filmography
 The Hunchback of Notre Dame (1911)
 The King of Paris (1923)
 Education of a Prince (1927)
 The Crew (1928)
 The Secret Courier (1928)
 The Love of the Brothers Rott (1929)
 Der Kongreß tanzt (1930)
 Accused, Stand Up! (1930)
 Gloria (1931)
 Monsieur, Madame and Bibi (1932)
 Our Lord's Vineyard (1932)
 In the Name of the Law (1932)
 Charlemagne (1933)
 The Uncle from Peking (1934)
 The Queen of Biarritz (1934)
 Little Jacques (1934)
 Mayerling (1936)
 Counsel for Romance (1936)

References

Bibliography
 Waldman, Harry. Maurice Tourneur: The Life and Films. McFarland, 2001.

External links

1879 births
1962 deaths
French male film actors
French male silent film actors
20th-century French male actors
Male actors from Paris